Figueirense Futebol Clube, commonly referred to as Figueirense, is a Brazilian professional club based in Florianópolis, Santa Catarina founded on 12 June 1921. It competes in the Campeonato Brasileiro Série B, the third tier of Brazilian football, as well as in the Campeonato Catarinense, the top flight of the Santa Catarina state football league.

History
The club was founded as Figueirense Football Club on June 12, 1921. The club is named Figueirense after the neighborhood where it is located, in Centro neighborhood). Figueirense means "from Figueira". Figueirense was one of the founders of the defunct Liga Catharinense de Desportos Terrestres, organized on April 12, 1923. In 1932 the team won their first state championship.  From 1935 to 1937, Figueirense was three times in a row Catarinense champion. In 1939, Figueirense won again the state championship, that was end of the Golden Decade of the club.

In 1972, was the end of the 30-year state championship titleless period. In 1973, Figueirense was the first team of Santa Catarina state in Campeonato Brasileiro Série A. In 1974, the team won Catarinense again.

In 1994, the 17-year state championship titleless period ended. In 1995, Figeirense was Torneio Mercosul champion (not to be confused with Copa Mercosur) at Santa Catarina. It was the club's first (and only) international title.

In 2001, the club was Campeonato Brasileiro Second Division runner-up, and was promoted to the following year's First Division. From 2002 to 2004, Figueirense was three times in a row Campeonato Catarinense champion. In 2008, Figueirense won the Copa São Paulo de Juniores for the first time after beating Rio Branco-SP 2–0 in the final. In the 2008 edition of Serie A, Figueirense finished in 17th place, being relegated to Serie B the following year.

In 2002, Rivaldo's and César Sampaio's company, called CSR Esporte & Marketing, and Figueirense signed a partnership. The company was responsible for the administration of the professional football of Figueirense. The partnership ended in 2004.

Some famous players who have played for Figueirense in the last decade are Edmundo, Loco Abreu, André Santos, Roberto Firmino, Filipe Luís, Cleiton Xavier, Felipe Santana, Michel Bastos and others.

Players

First team squad
.

Reserve team

Out on loan

First-team staff

Stadium

Figueirense's stadium is Estádio Orlando Scarpelli, built-in 1961, with a maximum capacity of 19,584 people. In 2005, Orlando Scarpelli became an all-seater stadium.

Honours
 Campeonato Catarinense
 Winners (18): 1932, 1935, 1936, 1937, 1939, 1941, 1972, 1974, 1994, 1999, 2002, 2003, 2004, 2006, 2008, 2014, 2015, 2018

 Copa Santa Catarina
 Winners (3): 1990, 1996, 2021

 Recopa Catarinense
 Winners (2): 2019, 2022

Managers

Mascot
Since September 2002, Figueirense's mascot is an anthropomorphic fig tree named Figueirinha, which means Little Fig Tree. The mascot is usually depicted wearing the club's home kit.

National and International competitions record

References

External links

Figueirense Official Web Site
Gavioes Alvinegros – Ultras/Fan Set

Figueirense FC
Association football clubs established in 1921
Football clubs in Santa Catarina (state)
Sport in Florianópolis
1921 establishments in Brazil